Victor Nyauchi (born 8 July 1992) is a Zimbabwean cricketer. He was the leading wicket-taker in the 2017–18 Logan Cup for Mountaineers, with 31 dismissals in eight matches.

In January 2020, he was named in Zimbabwe's Test squad for their series against Sri Lanka. He made his Test debut for Zimbabwe, against Sri Lanka, on 19 January 2020. In December 2020, he was selected to play for the Mountaineers in the 2020–21 Logan Cup.

In May 2022, Nyauchi was named in Zimbabwe's Twenty20 International (T20I) squad for their five-match home series against Namibia. Nyauchi made his T20I debut on 22 May 2022, for Zimbabwe against Namibia. In August 2022, he was named in Zimbabwe's ODI squad, for their series against Bangladesh. He made his ODI debut on 5 August 2022, for Zimbabwe against Bangladesh.

References

External links
 

1992 births
Living people
Zimbabwean cricketers
Zimbabwe Test cricketers
Zimbabwe Twenty20 International cricketers
Zimbabwe One Day International cricketers
Sportspeople from Harare
Mashonaland Eagles cricketers
Mountaineers cricketers